Gach-e Sofla (also Romanized as Gach-e Soflá and Gach Soflá; also known as Gach-e Pā’īn) is a village in Horjand Rural District, Kuhsaran District, Ravar County, Kerman Province, Iran. At the 2006 census, its population was 86, in 23 families.

References 

Populated places in Ravar County